Atahualpa Airport  was an airport formerly serving the town of Ibarra in Imbabura Province, Ecuador.

The 9/1/2015 image shows the runway gone and the land under commercial and residential development.

See also

 List of airports in Ecuador
 Transport in Ecuador

References

External links
 HERE Maps - Atahualpa
 OpenStreetMap - Atahualpa
 

Defunct airports in Ecuador
Airports in Ecuador